Music for Torching is a studio album by jazz singer Billie Holiday. A collection of torch songs, it was released in 1955 by Clef Records. It is her first 12-inch LP for the label, after four 10 inch LPs.

The music was recorded over the course of two sessions in Los Angeles, two days apart, which also resulted in all the material for her follow-up album Velvet Mood (MG C-713).

Track listing

A side
"It Had to Be You" (Isham Jones, Gus Kahn) - 4:02
"Come Rain or Come Shine" (Harold Arlen, Johnny Mercer) - 4:23
"I Don't Want to Cry Anymore" (Victor Schertzinger) - 3:55
"I Don't Stand a Ghost of a Chance with You" (Victor Young, Ned Washington, Bing Crosby) - 4:29

B side
"A Fine Romance" (Jerome Kern, Dorothy Fields) - 3:35
"Gone with the Wind" (Allie Wrubel, Herb Magidson) - 3:26
"I Get a Kick Out of You" (Cole Porter) - 5:42
"Isn't This a Lovely Day?" (Irving Berlin) - 4:16

Personnel
 Billie Holiday - Vocals
 Harry "Sweets" Edison - Trumpet
 Benny Carter - Alto saxophone
 Jimmy Rowles - Piano
 Barney Kessel - Guitar
 John Simmons - Bass
 Larry Bunker - Drums

References

1955 albums
Billie Holiday albums
Verve Records albums
Clef Records albums
Albums produced by Norman Granz
Albums with cover art by David Stone Martin